Boriskovo is a rural locality (a village) in Prigorodnoye Rural Settlement, Sokolsky District, Vologda Oblast, Russia. The population was 17 as of 2002.

Geography 
Boriskovo is located 14 km southeast of Sokol (the district's administrative centre) by road. Vasyutino is the nearest rural locality.

References 

Rural localities in Sokolsky District, Vologda Oblast